The Field of Vision is a 1956 novel by Wright Morris, written in the style of high modernism.  It won the U.S. National Book Award for Fiction in 1957.

References

External links
The Field of Vision at amazon.com
The Field of Vision at Google Book Search

1956 American novels
Harcourt (publisher) books
National Book Award for Fiction winning works